That's My Boy is a 1932 American pre-Code drama film directed by Roy William Neill and starring Richard Cromwell and Dorothy Jordan. John Wayne had a very small uncredited role in the film.

Plot
Expecting to become a doctor, Thomas Jefferson Scott enrolls at Thorpe University. A football coach there, "Daisy" Adams, finds out that while small, Tommy is quick and elusive and a natural at the sport. Tommy isn't interested in football, but jumps at the coach's offer of free tuition.

For the next two seasons, Tommy is a star player, nicknamed "Snakehips," and a hero on campus. But he resents that while he's worth a fortune to the college, he has little money and has jeopardized his future in medicine and with fiancee Dorothy by concentrating on football instead. Tommy demands $50,000. A university alumnus, Sedgwick, who is a stockbroker, sets up a holding company in which investors can put their money into Tommy's potential earnings.

Everything goes wrong. Sedgwick's investments are poor, he loses all of the money and commits suicide. Dorothy's father, who dislikes Tommy, tempts him with $50,000 if he will break off their engagement. Tommy thinks it over, then asks for $100,000. The crowd boos Tommy on the football field until the newspapers report that Tommy took the 100 grand and replenished the fund, ensuring everyone's investments. To the fans' cheers, Tommy wins the game for Thorpe, he ends up marrying Dorothy.

Cast
 Richard Cromwell as Tommy Jefferson Scott
 Dorothy Jordan as Dorothy Whitney
 Mae Marsh as Mom Scott
 Arthur Stone as Pop Scott
 Douglass Dumbrille as Coach "Daisy" Adams
 Lucien Littlefield as Uncle Louie
 Leon Ames as Al Williams 
 Russell Saunders as Pinkie
 Sumner Getchell as Carl
 Otis Harlan as Mayor
 Oscar 'Dutch' Hendrian as Hap
 Douglas Haig as Tommy, as a young boy
 John Wayne as Football Player (uncredited)

See also
 John Wayne filmography

References

External links

1932 films
1932 drama films
American drama films
American black-and-white films
Films directed by Roy William Neill
Columbia Pictures films
1930s English-language films
1930s American films